The United States Air Force's 711th Air Refueling Squadron (711 ARS) was an aerial refueling unit that operated the KC-10 Extender at Seymour Johnson AFB, North Carolina.  The unit was activated on 29 April 1994 to replace the departing 911th Air Refueling Squadron, then inactivated later in 1994.

Air refueling squadrons of the United States Air Force